The 5th Battle Squadron was a squadron of the British Royal Navy consisting of battleships. The 5th Battle Squadron was initially part of the Royal Navy's Second Fleet. During the First World War, the Home Fleet was renamed the Grand Fleet.

History

First World War

August 1914
In August 1914, the 5th Battle Squadron was based at Portland, and consisted of a number of pre-dreadnought battleships. These were:

 
 
 
 
 
 
 
 

With the commissioning of the five fast battleships of the Queen Elizabeth class, the remaining pre-dreadnoughts were sent to the Mediterranean.  herself was delayed in joining the squadron, instead taking part in the Dardanelles Campaign until May 1915.

Battle of Jutland
In 1916, the 5th Battle Squadron—under the command of Rear Admiral Hugh Evan-Thomas— was temporarily transferred to David Beatty's Battlecruiser Fleet. On 31 May, four ships of the Squadron served with distinction in the battle of Jutland. These were:

  Flagship of Rear Admiral H. Evan-Thomas; Captain A. W. Craig;
  Captain M. Woollcombe;
  Captain E. M. Philpotts;
  Captain the Honourable A. D. E. H. Boyle;

Three of the Queen Elizabeths received hits from German warships during the engagement, yet they all returned home, though Warspite—whose steering was jammed—was targeted by the German line, taking 15 hits and coming close to foundering.

After the battle, HMS Queen Elizabeth—which had missed the battle due to being in dock—rejoined the squadron.

Vice and Rear-Admirals commanding
Post holders as follows:

Second in Command 
Post holders as follows:

Footnotes

References
 Dittmar, F.J & Colledge J.J. (1972), British Warships 1914-1919 Ian Allan, London. 
 Gordon, Andrew. (1996), The Rules of the Game John Murray. 
 Harley, Simon; Lovell, Tony. "Fifth Battle Squadron (Royal Navy) - The Dreadnought Project". www.dreadnoughtproject.org. Harley & Lovell, 1 August 2017.
 Macintyre, Donald. (1957), Jutland Evans Brothers Ltd.

External links
 Fifth Battle Squadron at DreadnoughtProject.org
 Royal Navy History
 Composition of the Grand Fleet

Battle squadrons of the Royal Navy
Ship squadrons of the Royal Navy in World War I
Military units and formations established in 1912
Military units and formations disestablished in 1919